Johan Magnus Halvorsen (10 June 1853 – 14 February 1922) was a Norwegian politician for the Moderate Liberal Party.

Biography
Halvorsen was born at Ålesund in Møre og Romsdal, Norway.  He was a merchant by profession. He started his business career as a sales representative at Vanylven in Sunnmøre. In 1874 he became a director at Selje forbruksforening in Nordfjord. He later worked as a representative for several factories and businesses in Bergen. In 1881, he established himself as a merchant in Trondheim with a fish wholesaler. 

Halvorsen was a member of the city council of Trondheim 1895-1904 and again from 1910. He represented the city in the Norwegian Parliament 1898-1900 and 1903–12. He was Minister of Finance from 1907 to 1908 in cabinet of Prime Minister Jørgen Løvland.

References

1853 births
1922 deaths
Politicians from Ålesund
Norwegian merchants
Liberal Party (Norway) politicians
Members of the Storting
Presidents of the Storting
Ministers of Finance of Norway
19th-century Norwegian businesspeople